The Centenary Gentlemen basketball team represents Centenary College, located in Shreveport, Louisiana, in NCAA Division III men's basketball competition. The "Gentlemen" nickname is exclusive to men's athletes and teams; Ladies is used for women's teams and athletes. The team is a member of the Southern Collegiate Athletic Conference, which is part of the NCAA Division III. Prior to 2011, Centenary was a member of the NCAA Division I, and competed in the Summit League.

Recent coaching history
The Gentlemen were coached by Rob Flaska from 2005 until 2008. His contract was not renewed after the 2007–08 season. Greg Gary was hired to replace him. Mark Richmond has become the assistant coach for the Gents and brings big-time Big East experience from West Virginia to the staff.  He has worked under both Bob Huggins and John Beilein. In 2010 Adam Walsh became the head coach of The Gents.

Postseason results

NCAA Division III tournament results
The Gentlemen have appeared in the NCAA Division III tournament once. Their record is 0–1.

Gentlemen in the NBA
Robert Parish
Larry Robinson

References

External links